Patricia Eugenia Gutiérrez Salinas (born May 29, 1945 in Mexico City) is a Mexican actress.

Biography 

After completing her primary education she took a course in ballet and later enrolled at the Academy of Dramatic Art of the National Association of Actors (ANDA); however, these studies were only a complement to her education and she didn't really think of pursuing acting as a career.

At the end of 1960, Ismael Rodríguez sought a teen actress to play "Jacinta Cárdenas" in the film Los hermanos del hierro, for which he convened a contest. She participated and was selected from a group of over fifty young people, including several professional actresses. Just before the shooting began, she wanted to adopt a stage name and cinematographer Rosalío Solano suggested Patricia Conde. She had a short but successful film career, playing different characters.

In 1964, she married Rodolfo Enrique Serrano Anda, a marriage that lasted fourteen years and produced two children: Patricia and Rodolfo.

Since the late 1990s, she has staged something of a comeback, this time on television, but her work in youthful roles (from the 1960s) is best remembered today, where she played opposite the best-paid actors, singers, and heartthrobs of the time.

Filmography 

 Lo que la vida me robó (2013-2014) .... Madrina
 Amores verdaderos (2012-2013)....Profesora Astudillo
 Rosa Diamante (2012)....Leticia Sotomayor de Montenegro
 Amor bravío (2012)....Netty
 La rosa de Guadalupe (2009-2010)....Episodios: "Miss Narco" como Perla, "Con todo mi amor" como Arcelia y ''Fuera de Peligro'' como Cruz
 "Saturday Night live" (2009)....Ella misma
 Mi Pecado (2009) como La Directora del Orfanato
 Catalina y Sebastián (1999)
 Memoria del cine mexicano (1993)....Ella misma
 El pícaro (1967)....Sara
 Los hijos que yo soñé (1965)
 Los chicos de la noche (1965)
 La juventud se impone (1964)....Pati
 Los novios de mis hijas (1964)....Kay
 Museo de horror (1964)....Marta
 Canción de alma (1964)....Ana
 La sonrisa de los pobres (1964) 
 La edad de la violencia (1964)....Nancy
 Dile que la quiero (1963)
 Los bravos de California (1963)
 Paloma herida (1963)....Paloma
 Yo, el mujeriego (1963)....Patricia
 En la vieja California (1963)
 Una joven de 16 años (1963)....Elenita
 Mekishiko mushuku (1962)....Maria Ferrero
 El cielo y la tierra (1962)....Julia
 Cielo rojo (1962)
 Canción de juventud (1962)....Chica
 El caminante (1962)....Flor
 Los hermanos del Hierro (1961)....Jacinta Cárdenas

References

Univision

1945 births
Living people
Actresses from Mexico City
Mexican telenovela actresses
20th-century Mexican actresses
21st-century Mexican actresses